Cloridorme is a township municipality in the Gaspé Peninsula, Quebec, Canada. Cloridorme's economy is centred on fishing. Its population, according to the 2016 Canadian Census was 671. The township stretches for  along the Gulf of Saint Lawrence and includes Cloridorme Bay where the Little and Great Cloridorme Rivers have their mouths.

In addition to the village of Cloridorme itself, the township's territory also includes the communities of Cloridorme-Ouest, Petite-Anse, Pointe-à-la-Frégate, and Saint-Yvon.

An archival document established a "Chlorydormes" in the Jersey Islands, near the village of St-John. In addition, the research of Georges Le Feuvre demonstrates the contribution of the Jersyais in the primary population of the Gaspé area, including Cloridorme. This research indicates in particular that Lewis Gibaut, friend of Georges Godfray of Grand-Étang, a neighboring village of Cloridorme, and who worked for William Hyman and Sons, returned to die in Chlorydormes, St-John, in Jersey. A map of 1755 shows the plural form "Les Cloridormes", which had changed to "Les Chlorydormes" by the 19th century and remained in use until the early 20th century.  Cloridorme was created by a community of fishermen from Jersey Islands.  The chlorydormes were part of the city of St-John on Jersey Islands as mentioned in this archival document.

History

The area was first settled in 1838 by people from Montmagny. In 1853, a mission was set up, called Sainte-Cécile-de-Cloridorme. In 1871, the geographic township was formed, the following year the post office opened, and the year after that, the mission became a parish. In 1885, the Township Municipality of Cloridorme was established.

In 1957, the township lost a portion of its territory when Petite-Vallée became a separate incorporated municipality.

Demographics 

See also
 List of township municipalities in Quebec

References

External links
 Facts about Cloridorme

Township municipalities in Quebec
Incorporated places in Gaspésie–Îles-de-la-Madeleine